Dieter Kotlowski (born 18 July 1957) is an Austrian fencer. He competed in the team foil event at the 1984 Summer Olympics.

References

External links
 

1957 births
Living people
Austrian male foil fencers
Olympic fencers of Austria
Fencers at the 1984 Summer Olympics